Pocket Maar is a 1956 Indian Hindi-language crime film. Produced by Prem Sethi and directed by Harnam Singh Rawail the film stars Dev Anand, Geeta Bali and Nadira. The film's music is given by Madan Mohan. The film was remade in Tamil as Thirudathe.

Plot 
The movie revolves with the journey of Roshan, a Bombay based pickpocket and gambler. He steals money from a person who commits suicide later. Driven by guilt, he tries to remit this amount to the deceased man's family.

Cast 
 Dev Anand as Roshan
 Geeta Bali as Shukal
 Nadira as Rita
 Lalita Pawar
 Tun Tun
 Madan Bhandari
 Ramayan Tiwari as Shankar
 Sunder as Manglu mama
 Kumud Tripathi as money lender
 Bhagwan Sinha
 Pratima Devi
 Jagdish Kanwal

Soundtrack 
"Ye Nayi Nayi Preet Hai, Tu Hi To Mera Meet Hai" – Talat Mahmood, Lata Mangeshkar
"Chhoti Si Hai Zindagi Apni Khushi Se Ji" – Lata Mangeshkar
"Pyaase Nainon Ki Pyaas Bujhaa Le" – Lata Mangeshkar
"Duniya Ke Saath Chal Pyare" – Geeta Dutt
"Kisi Ke Thukra Kar Armaan Na Ja O Bedardi Nadan" – Lata Mangeshkar
"Ladi Aankh Se Aankh Mohabbat Ho Gai" – Lata Mangeshkar, Mohammed Rafi
"Teri Gali Kaise Aaoon Sajna" – Lata Mangeshkar
"Balma Anadi Manga De Ghoda Gadi" – Lata Mangeshkar

References

External links 
 

1956 films
1950s Hindi-language films
Films directed by H. S. Rawail
Films scored by Madan Mohan
Indian crime films
1956 crime films
Hindi films remade in other languages
Indian black-and-white films